Forever Yours is the debut album released in 1987 on Epic Records by R&B singer Tony Terry. The album peaked at #27 on the Billboard R&B Albums charts, and includes the charting singles "Forever Yours", "Lovey Dovey", and "She's Fly".

Track listing

Side 1
"Forever Yours" – 3:44
"Lovey Dovey" – 3:37
"Fulltime Girl" – 3:11
"Day Dreaming" – 3:54
"Here With Me" – 4:34

Side 2
"She's Fly" – 6:04
"Wassup Wit U" – 3:40
"Up & Down Love" – 4:11
"Young Love" – 3:58
"What Would It Take" – 4:42

Charts

Album

Singles

References

External links
Forever Yours at Discogs

1987 debut albums
Epic Records albums
Tony Terry albums